Bukova Gora may refer to:

 Bukova Gora, Tomislavgrad, a settlement in the Municipality of Tomislavgrad, Bosnia and Herzegovina
 Bukova Gora, Kočevje, a settlement in the Municipality of Kočevje, Slovenia